The women's 1000 metres in speed skating at the 1972 Winter Olympics took place on 11 February, at the Makomanai Open Stadium.

Records
Prior to this competition, the existing world and Olympic records were as follows:

The following new Olympic record was set.

Results

References

Women's speed skating at the 1972 Winter Olympics
Olymp
Skat